Aldo Mausner (born 8 March 1934) is an Italian violinist.  He and his parents survived World War II. Mausner was raised Catholic, but is of Jewish heritage.

References

Italian violinists
Living people
1934 births
Place of birth missing (living people)
21st-century violinists